Shevchenko is primarily referred to the Ukrainian surname Shevchenko.

Also often in honor of the Ukrainian poet Taras Shevchenko it may refer to the following.

Places
Shevchenko, name of Aktau, a city in Kazakhstan, in 1964–1992
Fort-Shevchenko, a town in Kazakhstan
Shevchenko Raion (disambiguation), name of several different districts in Ukraine
Shevchenko, Russia, name of several rural localities in Russia
Szewczenko, until 1910 the name of Vita, a village in Manitoba, Canada
Şevcenco, a village in Mocra Commune, Transnistria, Moldova

Organizations
Kyiv Shevchenko University, the largest university in Ukraine
Luhansk Shevchenko National Pedagogical University
Shevchenko Scientific Society, a non-governmental Ukrainian Academy of Sciences, based in Lviv